

Stephenston is a locality in the Australian state of South Australia located on the eastern side of the Flinders Ranges about  north of the state capital of Adelaide and about  east of the municipal seat of Quorn.

Boundaries for the locality were created in March 1997 for the “long established name“ which was “incorrectly spelt as Stephenson” in the South Australian Government Gazette of 13 March 1997 and is derived from the ceased Government Town of Stephenston whose site is located within the boundaries of the locality.

The Government Town of Stephenston which was located in the cadastral unit of the Hundred of Palmer was surveyed in February 1879, proclaimed on 17 July 1879 and was finally declared as ‘ceasing to exist’ on 11 May 1961.  A school operated from 1881 to 1915 and a post office operated from November 1879 to 1904.

Land use within the locality is concerned with primary production activities such as “pastoral and farming-related activities.” 

The 2016 Australian census which was conducted in August 2016 reports that Stephenston had a population of zero.

Stephenston is located within the federal division of Grey, the state electoral district of Giles and the local government area of the Flinders Ranges Council.

References

Towns in South Australia
Far North (South Australia)